Serbia and Montenegro was a country in Southeast Europe located in the Balkans that existed from 1992 to 2006, following the breakup of the Socialist Federal Republic of Yugoslavia (SFR Yugoslavia) which bordered Hungary to the north, Romania to the northeast, Bulgaria to the southeast, Macedonia to the south, Croatia and Bosnia and Herzegovina to the west, and Albania to the southwest. The state was founded on 27 April 1992 as the Federal Republic of Yugoslavia, known as FR Yugoslavia or simply Yugoslavia which comprised the Republic of Serbia and the Republic of Montenegro. In February 2003, FR Yugoslavia was transformed from a federal republic to a political union until Montenegro seceded from the union in June 2006, leading to the full independence of both Serbia and Montenegro.

Its aspirations to be the sole legal successor state to SFR Yugoslavia were not recognized by the United Nations, following the passing of United Nations Security Council Resolution 777, which affirmed that the Socialist Federal Republic of Yugoslavia had ceased to exist, and the Federal Republic of Yugoslavia was a new state. All former republics were entitled to state succession while none of them continued SFR Yugoslavia's international legal personality. However, the government of Slobodan Milošević opposed any such claims, and as such, FR Yugoslavia was not allowed to join the United Nations.

Throughout its existence, FR Yugoslavia had a tense relationship with the international community, as economic sanctions were issued against the state during the course of the Yugoslav Wars and Kosovo War. This also resulted in hyperinflation between 1992 and 1994. FR Yugoslavia's involvement in the Yugoslav Wars ended with the Dayton Agreement, which recognized the independence of the Republics of Croatia, Slovenia, and Bosnia and Herzegovina, as well as establishing diplomatic relationships between the states, and a guaranteed role of the Serbian population within Bosnian politics. Later on, growing separatism within the Autonomous Province of Kosovo and Metohija, a region of Serbia heavily populated by ethnic Albanians, resulted in an insurrection by the Kosovo Liberation Army, an Albanian separatist group. The outbreak of the Kosovo War reintroduced Western sanctions, as well as eventual Western involvement in the conflict. The conflict ended with the adoption of United Nations Security Council Resolution 1244, which guaranteed economic and political separation of Kosovo from FR Yugoslavia, to be placed under UN Administration.

Economic hardship and war resulted in growing discontent with the government of Slobodan Milošević and his allies, who ran both Serbia and Montenegro as an effective dictatorship. This would eventually cumulate in the Bulldozer revolution, which saw his government overthrown, and replaced by one led by the Democratic Opposition of Serbia and Vojislav Koštunica, which also joined the UN.

The Federal Republic of Yugoslavia ended in 2003 after the Federal Assembly of Yugoslavia voted to enact the Constitutional Charter of Serbia and Montenegro, which established the State Union of Serbia and Montenegro. As such, the name Yugoslavia was consigned to history. A growing independence movement in Montenegro, led by Milo Đukanović meant that the Constitution of Serbia and Montenegro included a clause allowing for a referendum on the question of Montenegrin independence, after a period of three years had passed. In 2006, the referendum was called, and passed, by a narrow margin. This led to the dissolution of the State Union of Serbia and Montenegro, and the establishment of the independent republics of Serbia and Montenegro, turning Serbia into a landlocked country. This can be considered the last act which finalized the dissolution of Yugoslavia.

Name 
At the country's founding in 1992 following the breakup of the Socialist Federal Republic of Yugoslavia (SFR Yugoslavia), the country's official name was the Federal Republic of Yugoslavia (FR Yugoslavia), as it claimed to be the sole legal successor state of the SFR Yugoslavia. The United States and European Union member states referred to the country as Serbia and Montenegro as their governments viewed its claim to Yugoslavia's successorship as illegitimate. 

The 2003 constitution stated that the name of the state was simply "Serbia and Montenegro", dropping all claims to successorship of the SFR Yugoslavia.

History 
After the collapse of SFR Yugoslavia in the 1990s, the two Serb majority republics, Serbia and Montenegro, agreed to remain as Yugoslavia, and established a new constitution in 1992, which established the Federal Republic of Yugoslavia essentially as a rump state, with a population consisting of a majority of Serbs. The new state abandoned the Communist legacy: the red star was removed from the national flag, and the communist coat of arms was replaced by a new coat of arms representing Serbia and Montenegro. The new state also established the office of the president, held by a single person, initially appointed with the consent of the republics of Serbia and Montenegro until 1997 after which the president was democratically elected. The President of Yugoslavia acted alongside the Presidents of the republics of Serbia and Montenegro. Initially, all three offices were dominated by allies of Slobodan Milosevic and his Socialist Party of Serbia.

Foundation 
On 26 December 1991, Serbia, Montenegro, and the Serb rebel-held territories in Croatia agreed that they would form a new "third Yugoslavia". Efforts were also made in 1991 to include SR Bosnia and Herzegovina within the federation, with negotiations between Miloševic, Bosnia's Serbian Democratic Party, and the Bosniak proponent of union – Bosnia's Vice-president Adil Zulfikarpašić taking place on this matter. Zulfikarpašić believed that Bosnia could benefit from a union with Serbia, Montenegro, and Krajina, thus he supported a union which would secure the unity of Serbs and Bosniaks. Milošević continued negotiations with Zulfikarpašić to include Bosnia within a new Yugoslavia, however efforts to include the whole of Bosnia within a new Yugoslavia effectively terminated by late 1991 as Izetbegović planned to hold a referendum on independence while the Bosnian Serbs and Bosnian Croats formed autonomous territories. Violence between ethnic Serbs and Bosniaks soon broke out. Thus, FR Yugoslavia was restricted to the republics of Serbia and Montenegro, and became closely associated with breakaway Serb republics during the Yugoslav Wars.

Yugoslav Wars 

The FRY was suspended from a number of international institutions. This was due to the ongoing Yugoslav wars during the 1990s, which had prevented agreement being reached on the disposition of federal assets and liabilities, particularly the national debt. The Government of Yugoslavia supported Croatian and Bosnian Serbs in the wars from 1992 to 1995. Because of that, the country was under economic and political sanctions. War and sanctions resulted in economic disaster, which forced thousands of its young citizens to emigrate from the country.

FR Yugoslavia acted to support Serbian separatist movements in breakaway states, including the Republic of Serbian Krajina and the Republika Srpska, and sought to establish them as independent Serbian republics, with potential eventual reintegration with FR Yugoslvia. However, the Government of FR Yugoslavia would treat these republics as separate entities, and gave unofficial, rather than active, aid by transferring control of units from the JNA to the secessionist movements. In this way, FR Yugoslavia avoided potential accusations of committing acts of aggression against the breakaway republics recognised by the international community. Slobodan Milošević, the President of Serbia, did not consider himself to be at war with the breakaway republics of Yugoslavia.

Following the transfer of Yugoslav Army units, the state of FR Yugoslavia ceased to play an important military role in the Yugoslav Wars, barring conflicts on the border with Croatia, such as the Siege of Dubrovnik. It instead provided economic and political aid, to avoid provoking the international community further, and to preserve FR Yugoslavia as the republics of Serbia and Montenegro, rather than 'Greater Serbia.'

In 1995, following Operation Storm, a military offensive by the Croatian Army, and NATO involvement in the Bosnian War, President Slobodan Milošević agreed to negotiate, as the Serbian position within Bosnia had become substantially worse. Under threat of economically crippling the Republika Srpska, he took over negotiating powers for all Serbian secessionist movements, as well as FR Yugoslavia. The ensuing Dayton Agreements, signed between representatives from the Federal Republic of Yugoslavia, the Republic of Bosnia and Herzegovina and the Republic of Croatia, resulted in each state being recognised as sovereign states. It also provided recognition for Serbian institutions and a rotating presidency within Bosnia and Herzegovina, and the Serbian populated areas of the former Socialist Republic of Bosnia were absorbed into Bosnia and Herzegovina. Thus the Yugoslav Wars ended, and Western sanctions on FR Yugoslavia were lifted. However, Slobodan Milošević would not achieve his dreams of admitting FR Yugoslavia to the United Nations as the successor state of SFR Yugoslavia, as an 'outer wall' of Western sanctions prohibited this.

Economic collapse during Yugoslav Wars 

Following the adoption of economic sanctions by the international community against FR Yugoslavia, its economy experienced a collapse. Sanctions on fuel meant that fuel stations across the country ran out of petrol, and foreign assets were seized. The average income of inhabitants of FR Yugoslavia was halved from $3,000 to $1,500. An estimated 3 million Yugoslavs (Serbs and Montenegrins) lived below the poverty line, suicide rates increased by 22% and hospitals lacked basic equipment. Along with this, supply links were cut, which meant that the Yugoslav economy could not grow, and imports or exports needed for industries could not be obtained, forcing them to close. The crippled state of the Yugoslav economy also affected its ability to wage war, and after 1992, Yugoslavia had an extremely limited military role within the Yugoslav Wars, due to the JNA units being unable to operate without oil or munitions.

On top of this, starting in 1992 and until 1994, the Yugoslav dinar experienced a major hyperinflation, leading to inflation reaching 313 million percent, the second worst hyperinflation in history. Many parts of FR Yugoslavia, including all of Montenegro, adopted the Deutsche Mark and Euro currencies instead of the Yugoslav dinar. Western sanctions crippled the Yugoslav economy, and prevented it from playing an active role in aiding Serb breakaway republics. Following the Dayton Agreement, the UN Security Council voted to lift most sanctions, but they were reissued following the outbreak of an Albanian insurgency in Kosovo. The lasting economic impact can be attributed to the eventual downfall of FR Yugoslavia and Slobodan Milošević's government, as well as a deeper desire in Montenegro to leave Yugoslavia.

Kosovo War 

In the Autonomous Province of Kosovo and Metohija, a growing desire for independence emerged among the Albanian majority population. Already, an unrecognised Republic of Kosova had emerged with underground institutions. In 1996, the Kosovo Liberation Army, an Albanian militia promoting Kosovar independence, launched attacks against Serbian police stations, killing at least ten Serbian policemen in direct attacks between 1996 and 1998. The low level insurgency eventually escalated. After Slobodan Milošević was elected President of Yugoslavia in 1997, having served his maximum two terms as President of Serbia, he ordered JNA units to move into Kosovo to aid in the suppression of the insurrection. The governments of FR Yugoslavia and the US declared the Kosovo Liberation Army a terrorist organisation, following repeated deadly attacks against Yugoslav law enforcement agencies. US intelligence also mentioned illegal arms sources of the Kosovo Liberation Army, including conducting raids during the course of the Albanian Civil War, and drug dealing. Despite this, substantial evidence now shows that the CIA had aided in training units of the KLA, although not necessarily providing them with arms and funding.

In 1998, the Kosovo War began, following increased open combat with Yugoslav police and JNA units deployed by Milošević. The KLA found itself heavily outnumbered and outgunned in open combat, and had to use guerrilla tactics. Serbian police and JNA units attacked KLA outposts, attempting to destroy them, as KLA units attempted to avoid direct confrontation and use terrorist attacks, including bombings and ambushes, to weaken Yugoslav control. Although unable to gain a strategic advantage, Yugoslav Army units found themselves in a tactical advantage against KLA units which lacked proper training. JNA units themselves lacked morale, and attacks were often directed against civilian targets rather than military targets. 863,000 Albanian civilians were forcibly expelled between March and June 1999 from Kosovo. 169,824 Serb and Romani civilians were estimated by the UNHCR's Belgrade office to have fled from Kosovo-Metohija to either Serbia proper, the Autonomous Province of Vojvodina, or the constituent Republic of Montenegro by 20 June 1999. Out of 10,317 civilians, 8,676 Albanians, 1,196 Serbs and 445 Roma, Bosniaks, Montenegrins and others were killed or went missing in connection with the war between 1 January 1998 - 31 December 2000. The Serbian government attributed 1,953 Serbian, 361 Albanian and 266 other civilian deaths or disappearances from 1 January 1998 - 1 November 2001 to “Albanian terrorism in Kosovo-Metohija”.

The international community was quick to respond, issuing a peace proposal to Yugoslavia in 1999. The agreement was seen as an essential ultimatum by NATO to Yugoslavia, and this rejected by the Yugoslav government. NATO responded in March 1999 by ordering airstrikes against Yugoslav military targets and infrastructure, including roads, railroads, administrative buildings and the headquarters of Radio Television Serbia. NATO's bombing campaign was not approved by the UN Security Council, for fear of a veto by Russia, which would cause controversy as to its legality. The UN Security Council adopted United Nations Security Council Resolution 1160, renewing arms and oil sanctions against FR Yugoslavia, and thus crippling its economy. The effects of continuous aerial bombardment and sanctions cost the Yugoslav economy hundreds of billions of USD and eventually forced Milošević's government to comply with an agreement put forward by an international delegation. United Nations Security Council Resolution 1244 led to substantial autonomy for Kosovo, and the establishment of a UN mission to Kosovo, as well as the complete withdrawal of units of the Yugoslav National Army. As such, Kosovo remained an Autonomous Province of Serbia, but politically and economically independent. The damage to FR Yugoslavia was immense, with the government estimating $100 billion in infrastructure damage, as well as 1,200 Serbian and Albanian civilians or soldiers confirmed dead. Economists have estimated at least $29 billion in direct damages caused by the bombings.

In the aftermath of the Kosovo War, a low level insurgency continued in parts of Southern Serbia, which had Albanian minorities. However, this insurgency lacked international support, and the Yugoslav Armed Forces were able to put down the insurgency.

Bulldozer Revolution 

The string of defeats, as well as a complete collapse of the Yugoslav economy, led to mass unpopularity of the essential dictatorship of Slobodan Milošević and his allies in the Socialist Party of Serbia. In September 2000, amongst accusations of electoral fraud, large scale protests struck the nation. Milošević was eventually removed from power, as his Socialist Party of Serbia lost in the federal elections to the Democratic Opposition of Serbia. In the aftermath, a new government in Yugoslavia negotiated with the United Nations, accepting that it was not the sole legal successor to the Socialist Federal Republic of Yugoslavia, and was allowed to join the UN. Milošević would later be put on trial for corruption and war crimes, especially during the International Criminal Tribunal for the former Yugoslavia, although he died in prison before his trial could end in 2006. His culpability, especially of the charges brought against him in the context of the ICTY, remains a subject of controversy within Serbia.

Gradual dissolution 

In 2002, Serbia and Montenegro came to a new agreement regarding continued co-operation, which, among other changes, promised the end of the name Yugoslavia (since they were part of the Federal Republic of Yugoslavia). On 4 February 2003, the Federal Assembly of Yugoslavia created a loose state union or confederacy—the State Union of Serbia and Montenegro, although Yugoslavia was still commonly used. A new constitutional charter was agreed to provide a framework for the governance of the country.

On Sunday, 21 May 2006, Montenegrins voted in an independence referendum, with 55.5% supporting independence. Fifty-five percent or more of affirmative votes were needed to dissolve the confederation and Yugoslavia. The turnout was 86.3% and 99.73% of the more than 477,000 votes cast were deemed valid. 

The subsequent Montenegrin proclamation of independence on 3 June 2006 and the Serbian proclamation of independence on 5 June ended the confederation of Serbia and Montenegro and thus the last remaining vestiges of the former Yugoslavia.

Politics 

The Federal Assembly of Yugoslavia, representing FR Yugoslavia (1992–2003) was composed of two chambers: the Council of Citizens and the Council of Republics. Whereas the Council of Citizens served as an ordinary assembly, representing the people of FR Yugoslavia, the Council of Republics was made equally by representatives from the federation's constituent republics, to ensure federal equality between Serbia and Montenegro.

The first president from 1992 to 1993 was Dobrica Ćosić, a former communist Yugoslav partisan during World War II and later one of the fringe contributors of the controversial Memorandum of the Serbian Academy of Sciences and Arts. Despite being head of the country, Ćosić was forced out of office in 1993 due to his opposition to Serbian President Slobodan Milošević. Ćosić was replaced by Zoran Lilić who served from 1993 to 1997, and then followed by Milošević becoming Yugoslav President in 1997 after his last legal term as Serbian president ended in 1997. FR Yugoslavia was dominated by Milosevic and his allies, until the presidential election in 2000. There were accusations of vote fraud and Yugoslav citizens took to the streets and engaged in riots in Belgrade demanding that Milošević be removed from power. Shortly afterwards Milošević resigned and Vojislav Koštunica took over as Yugoslav president and remained president until the state's reconstitution as the State Union of Serbia and Montenegro.

Federal Prime Minister Milan Panić became frustrated with Milošević's domineering behaviour during diplomatic talks in 1992, and told Milošević to "shut up" because Milošević's position was officially subordinate to his position. Milošević later forced Panić to resign. However, this situation changed after 1997 when Milošević's second and last legal term as Serbian President ended. He then had himself elected Federal President, thus entrenching the power that he already de facto held.

After the federation was reconstituted as a State Union, the new Assembly of the State Union was created. It was unicameral and was made up of 126 deputies, of which 91 were from Serbia and 35 were from Montenegro. The Assembly convened in the building of the old Federal Assembly of Yugoslavia, which now houses the National Assembly of Serbia.

In 2003, after the constitutional changes and creation of the State Union of Serbia and Montenegro, a new President of Serbia and Montenegro was elected. He was also president of the Council of Ministers of Serbia and Montenegro.
Svetozar Marović was the first and last President of Serbia and Montenegro until its breakup in 2006.

On April 12, 1999, the Federal Assembly of the FR Yugoslavia passed the "Decision on the accession of the FRY to the Union State of Russia and Belarus". The legal successor of that decision is the Republic of Serbia.

Military 
The Armed Forces of Yugoslavia (Serbian: Војска Југославије/Vojska Jugoslavije, ВЈ/VJ) included ground forces with internal and border troops, naval forces, air and air defense forces, and civil defense. It was established from the remnants of the Yugoslav National Army (JNA), the military of SFR Yugoslavia. Several Bosnian Serb units of the VJ were transferred over to the Republika Srpska, during the course of the Bosnian War, leaving only units directly from Serbia and Montenegro in the armed forces. The VJ saw military action during the Yugoslav Wars, including the Siege of Dubrovnik and the Battle of Vukovar, as well as the Kosovo War, and played combat roles during ethnic insurgencies. Following the Kosovo War, the VJ was forced to evacuate Kosovo, and in 2003 it was renamed the ''Armed Forces of Serbia and Montenegro.'' Following the dissolution of the Union between Serbia and Montenegro, units from each army were assigned to the independent republics of Serbia and Montenegro, as recruitment in the army was on a local, rather than Federal, level. Montenegro inherited the small navy of FR Yugoslavia, due to Serbia being landlocked.

Administrative divisions 

FR Yugoslavia was composed of four principal political units, consisting of two Republics, and two subordinate Autonomous Provinces, as following:
The Republic of Serbia (capital: Belgrade), including Central Serbia;
Kosovo and Metohija – Autonomous province within Serbia (capital: Pristina). Under United Nations administration from June 1999 under the terms of the Kumanovo Agreement.
Vojvodina, Autonomous province within Serbia (capital: Novi Sad).
The Republic of Montenegro (capital: Podgorica).

Serbia 

The territorial organisation of the Republic of Serbia was regulated by the Law on Territorial Organisation and Local Self-Government, adopted in the Assembly of Serbia on 24 July 1991. Under the Law, the municipalities, cities and settlements make the bases of the territorial organization.

Serbia was divided into 195 municipalities and 4 cities, which were the basic units of local autonomy. It had two autonomous provinces: Kosovo and Metohija in the south (with 30 municipalities), which was under the administration of UNMIK after 1999, and Vojvodina in the north (with 46 municipalities and 1 city). The territory between Kosovo and Vojvodina was called Central Serbia. Central Serbia was not an administrative division on its own and had no regional government of its own.

In addition, there were four cities: Belgrade, Niš, Novi Sad and Kragujevac, each having an assembly and budget of its own. The cities comprised several municipalities, divided into "urban" (in the city proper) and "other" (suburban). Competences of cities and their municipalities were divided.

Municipalities were gathered into districts, which are regional centres of state authority, but have no assemblies of their own; they present purely administrative divisions, and host various state institutions such as funds, office branches and courts. The Republic of Serbia was then and is still today divided into 29 districts (17 in Central Serbia, 7 in Vojvodina and 5 in Kosovo, which are now defunct), while the city of Belgrade presents a district of its own.

Montenegro 

Montenegro was divided into 21 municipalities.

Geography 

Serbia and Montenegro had an area of 102,350 square kilometres (39,518 sq mi), with 199 kilometres (124 mi) of coastline. The terrain of the two republics is extremely varied, with much of Serbia comprising plains and low hills (except in the more mountainous region of Kosovo and Metohija) and much of Montenegro consisting of high mountains. Serbia is entirely landlocked, with the coastline belonging to Montenegro. The climate is similarly varied. The north has a continental climate (cold winters and hot summers); the central region has a combination of a continental and Mediterranean climate; the southern region had an Adriatic climate along the coast, with inland regions experiencing hot, dry summers and autumns and relatively cold winters with heavy snowfall inland.

Belgrade, with its population of 1,574,050, is the largest city in the two nations: and the only one of significant size. The country's other principal cities were Novi Sad, Niš, Kragujevac, Podgorica, Subotica, Pristina, and Prizren, each with populations of about 100,000–250,000 people.

Demographics 

FR Yugoslavia had more demographic variety than most other European countries. According to the 1992 census, the Federal Republic had 10,394,026 inhabitants. The three largest named nationalities were Serbs (6,504,048 inhabitants, or 62.6%), Albanians (1,714,768 inhabitants, or 16.5%), and Montenegrins (519,766 inhabitants, or 5%). The country also had significant populations of Hungarians, ethnic Yugoslavs, ethnic Muslims, Romani, Croats, Bulgarians, Macedonians, Romanians and Vlachs, and others (under 1%). Most of the ethnic diversity was situated in the autonomous provinces of Kosovo and Vojvodina, where smaller numbers of other minority groups could be found. The large Albanian population was chiefly concentrated in Kosovo, with smaller populations in the Preševo Valley, and in the Ulcinj municipality in Montenegro. The Muslim (Slavic Muslims, including Bosniaks and Gorani) population lived mostly in the federal border region (mainly Novi Pazar in Serbia, and Rožaje in Montenegro). It is important to note that the Montenegrin population often considered themselves as Serbs.

Total Population of FR Yugoslavia – 10,019,657
Serbia (total): 9,396,411
Vojvodina: 2,116,725
Central Serbia: 5,479,686
Kosovo: 1,800,000
Montenegro: 623,246
Major cities (over 100,000 inhabitants) – 2002 data (2003 for Podgorica):
Beograd (Belgrade): 1,280,639 (1,574,050 metro)
Novi Sad: 215,600 (298,139 metro)
Pristina: 200,000 (2002 estimate)
Niš: 173,390 (234,863 metro)
Kragujevac: 145,890 (175,182 metro)
Podgorica: 139,500 (169,000 metro)
Prizren: 121,000 (2002 estimate)
Subotica: 99,471 (147,758 metro)

More than half of Kosovo's pre-1999 Serb population (226,000), including 37,000 Romani, 15,000 Balkan Muslims (including Ashkali, Bosniaks, and Gorani), and 7,000 other non-Albanian civilians were expelled to central Serbia and Montenegro, following the Kosovo War.

According to a 2004 estimate, the State Union had 10,825,900 inhabitants. According to a July 2006 estimate, the State Union had 10,832,545 inhabitants.

Economy 

The state suffered significantly economically due to the breakup of Yugoslavia and mismanagement of the economy, and an extended period of economic sanctions. In the early 1990s, the FRY suffered from hyperinflation of the Yugoslav dinar. By the mid-1990s, the FRY had overcome the inflation. Further damage to Yugoslavia's infrastructure and industry caused by the Kosovo War left the economy only half the size it was in 1990. Since the ousting of former Federal Yugoslav President Slobodan Milošević in October 2000, the Democratic Opposition of Serbia (DOS) coalition government has implemented stabilization measures and embarked on an aggressive market reform program. After renewing its membership in the International Monetary Fund in December 2000, Yugoslavia continued to reintegrate with other world nations by rejoining the World Bank and the European Bank for Reconstruction and Development.

The smaller republic of Montenegro severed its economy from federal control and from Serbia during the Milošević era. Afterwards, the two republics had separate central banks whilst Montenegro began to use different currencies – it first adopted the Deutsche Mark, and continued to use it until the Mark fell into disuse to be replaced by the Euro. Serbia continued to use the Yugoslav Dinar, renaming it the Serbian Dinar.

The complexity of the FRY's political relationships, slow progress in privatisation, and stagnation in the European economy were detrimental to the economy. Arrangements with the IMF, especially requirements for fiscal discipline, were an important element in policy formation. Severe unemployment was a key political and economic problem. Corruption also presented a major problem, with a large black market and a high degree of criminal involvement in the formal economy.

Transport 

Serbia, and in particular the valley of the Morava is often described as "the crossroads between the East and the West" – one of the primary reasons for its turbulent history. The valley is by far the easiest land route from continental Europe to Greece and Asia Minor.

Major international highways going through Serbia were E75 and E70. E763/E761 was the most important route connecting Serbia with Montenegro.

The Danube, an important international waterway, flowed through Serbia.

The Port of Bar was the largest seaport located in Montenegro.

Holidays 

Holidays celebrated only in Serbia
15 February – Sretenje (National Day, non-working)

Holidays celebrated only in Montenegro
13 July – Statehood Day (non-working)

Proposed national flag and anthem for the State Union 

After the formation of the State Union of Serbia and Montenegro, the Yugoslav tricolour was to be replaced by a new compromise flag. Article 23 of the Law for the implementation of the Constitutional Charter stated that a law specifying the new flag was to be passed within 60 days of the first session of the new joint parliament. Among the flag proposals, the popular choice was a flag with a shade of blue in between the Serbian tricolor and the Montenegrin tricolor of 1993 through 2004. The color shade Pantone 300C was perceived as the best choice. However the parliament failed to vote on the proposal within the legal time-frame and the flag was not adopted. In 2004, Montenegro adopted a radically different flag, as its independence-leaning government sought to distance itself from Serbia. Proposals for a compromise flag were dropped after this and the Union of Serbia and Montenegro never adopted a flag.

A similar fate befell the country's state anthem and coat-of-arms to be; the above-mentioned Article 23 also stipulated that a law determining the State Union's flag and anthem was to be passed by the end of 2003. The official proposal for a state anthem was a combination piece consisting of one verse of the former (now current) Serbian national anthem "Bože pravde" followed by a verse of the Montenegrin folk song, "Oj, svijetla majska zoro". This proposal was dropped after some public opposition, notably by Serbian Patriarch Pavle. Another legal deadline passed and no state anthem was adopted. Serious proposals for the coat of arms were never put forward, probably because the coat of arms of the FRY, adopted in 1994 combining Serbian and Montenegrin heraldic elements, was considered adequate.

Thus, the State Union never officially adopted state symbols and continued to use the flag and national anthem of the Federal Republic of Yugoslavia by inertia until its dissolution in 2006.

Sports

Association football 

FR Yugoslavia, later Serbia and Montenegro, was considered by FIFA and UEFA to be the only successor-state of Yugoslavia. Football was experiencing major success during the 1980s and early 1990s; however, due to the imposed economic sanctions, the country was excluded from all international competitions between 1992 and 1996. After the sanctions were lifted, the national team qualified for two FIFA World Cups—in 1998 as FR Yugoslavia and in 2006 as Serbia and Montenegro. It also qualified for Euro 2000, as FR Yugoslavia.

The 1998 World Cup appearance in France was accompanied with plenty of expectation and quiet confidence as the team was considered to be one of the tournament's dark horses due to being stacked with proven world-class players such as 29-year-old Predrag Mijatović, 33-year-old Dragan Stojković, 29-year-old Siniša Mihajlović, 28-year-old Vladimir Jugović, and 31-year-old Dejan Savićević, as well as emerging 19-year-old youngster Dejan Stanković, and tall 24-year-old target forwards Savo Milošević and Darko Kovačević. Another reason for heightened expectations was that this was the country's first major international appearance following the UN-imposed exile. However, the squad never managed to hit top gear—although it did make it out of the group, it got eliminated by the Netherlands via an injury-time goal in the round-of-16. Two years later at Euro 2000, nearly the same team again made it out of the group and was again eliminated from the tournament by the Netherlands, this time convincingly, 1–6, in the quarter finals.

Serbia and Montenegro were represented by a single national team in the 2006 FIFA World Cup tournament, despite having formally split just weeks prior to its start. The final squad was made up of players born in both Serbia and Montenegro.

They played their last ever international on 21 June 2006, a 3–2 loss to Ivory Coast. Following the World Cup, this team has been inherited by Serbia, while a new one was to be organized to represent Montenegro in future international competitions.

Basketball 
The senior men's basketball team dominated European and world basketball during the mid-to-late 1990s and early 2000s, with three EuroBasket titles (1995, 1997, and 2001), two FIBA World Cup titles (1998 and 2002), and a Summer Olympic Games silver medal (1996).

The national team started competing internationally in 1995, after a three-year exile, due to a UN trade embargo. During that time, FR Yugoslavia was not allowed to compete at the 1992 Summer Olympics in Barcelona, the 1993 EuroBasket, and also the 1994 FIBA World Championship, which was originally supposed to be hosted by Belgrade, before being taken away from the city and moved to Toronto, Canada.

At the 1995 EuroBasket in Athens, its first international competition, the hungry and highly motivated FR Yugoslav team, which was led by head coach Dušan Ivković, featured a starting five full of world-class talent, with established European stars at positions one through four — 27-year-old Saša Đorđević, 25-year-old Predrag Danilović, 29-year-old Žarko Paspalj, 22-year-old Dejan Bodiroga — capped off with 27-year-old Vlade Divac, the starting center for the LA Lakers at the five position. With a bench that was just as capable — with experienced Zoran Sretenović (the only player over 30 in the team), Saša Obradović, talisman power forward Zoran Savić, and up-and-coming young center Željko Rebrača — the team rampaged through its preliminary group, which featured medal contenders Greece and Lithuania, with a 6–0 record. At the first direct elimination stage, the quarterfinals, FR Yugoslavia scored 104 points to destroy France, thus setting up a semifinal clash with the tournament hosts Greece. In the highly charged atmosphere of the OAKA Indoor Arena, the FR Yugoslav team demonstrated its versatility, using defensive prowess in that game to pull off a famous eight-point win, in a tense, low-scoring 60–52 game. In the final, FR Yugoslavia played against the experienced Lithuanian team, which was led by basketball legend Arvydas Sabonis, in addition to other world class players like Šarūnas Marčiulionis, Rimas Kurtinaitis, and Valdemaras Chomičius. The final became a classic game of international basketball, with the crafty Yugoslavs prevailing, by a score of 96–90, behind Đorđević's 41 points.

They were represented by a single team at the 2006 FIBA World Championship as well, even though tournament was played in mid/late-August and early-September of that year, and the Serbia–Montenegro breakup had occurred in May. That team was also inherited by Serbia after the tournament, while Montenegro created a separate senior national basketball team afterwards, as well as their own national teams in all other team sports.

Entertainment 
Serbia and Montenegro was represented after its formal dissolution in the Miss Earth 2006 pageant by a single delegate, Dubravka Skoric.

Serbia and Montenegro also participated in the Eurovision Song Contest on two occasions and in Junior Eurovision Song Contest 2005 only on one occasion. The country debuted in the Eurovision Song Contest under the name Serbia and Montenegro in 2004, when Željko Joksimović got second place. The next to follow was the Montenegrin boyband No Name. In 2006, the year of Montenegrin independence, the country Serbia and Montenegro did not have a representative due to the scandal in Evropesma 2006, but was still able to vote in both the semi-final and the final.

See also 

List of national border changes since World War I
Military of FR Yugoslavia

Notes

References

Citations

Sources

External links

Country Profile: Serbia and Montenegro, BBC

 
Former federations
Former confederations
Modern history of Serbia
Former countries in the Balkans
Former state unions
States and territories established in 1992
States and territories disestablished in 2006
1992 establishments in Europe
2006 disestablishments in Europe
2000s in Kosovo
2000s in Montenegro
2000s in Serbia
20th century rump states
2006 disestablishments in Serbia and Montenegro
Former member states of the United Nations